Kalyan West Assembly constituency is one of the 288 Vidhan Sabha (legislative assembly) constituencies of Maharashtra state, western India. This constituency is located in Thane district.

Geographical scope
The constituency comprises parts of Kalyan Taluka, that is parts of Kalyan Dombivali Municipal Corporation viz. wards 1 to 12 and 35 to 50 and Manda saja in Kalyan revenue circle.

List of Members of Legislative Assembly

Election results

Assembly Elections 2009

Assembly Elections 2014

Assembly Elections 2019

References

Assembly constituencies of Thane district
Assembly constituencies of Maharashtra